Sound of Colors is a 2001 Taiwanese children's picture book written and illustrated by Jimmy Liao. The Chinese title means "subway", and the book follows a blind girl's imaginations as she rides the city's rapid transit. The book was translated to English by Sarah L. Thomson and published in 2006 as The Sound of Colors.

Reception
Publishers Weekly wrote the book "offers a meditation on blindness that will stay with readers long after they have closed the paper-over-board book".

Translations
English: 
Japanese: 
Korean: 
Thai: 
Spanish: 
French: 
Italian: 
Polish: 
Dutch: 
Vietnamese:

Adaptations
Sound of Colors, a 2003 film directed by Joe Ma, starring Miriam Yeung, Tony Leung Chiu-wai, Dong Jie and Chang Chen
Sound of Colors, a 2006 TV series directed by Zhang Min, starring Ruby Lin, Wallace Huo, Hao Lei and Huang Meng

References

2001 children's books
Chinese-language books
Literature about blindness
Picture books by Jimmy Liao